This is a list of museums in Madhya Pradesh state in central India.

See also
 List of museums in India

Notes

 
Museums
Madhya Pradesh
M